is the fifteenth studio album by Japanese visual kei rock band MUCC, released on June 10, 2020 by Danger Crue. It was released in three editions: the regular edition with sixteen tracks, the limited edition with a bonus DVD and the fan club limited edition with a 48-page booklet.

Aku peaked at the sixth position on weekly charts and first position on daily charts of Oricon Albums Chart.

Track listing

Personnel 
 Tatsurou – vocals
 Miya – guitar
 Yukke – bass guitar
 Satochi – drums

Additional musicians 
 Tooru Yoshida – keyboards

Charts

References 

2020 albums
Mucc albums
Japanese-language albums